Kasper Bai (born 1974) is a Danish songwriter, composer, arranger and guitarist.  He was born in Hjørring, studied at the Royal Academy of Music in Aarhus, and now lives and works in Copenhagen.  He is known for his Jazz/Classical crossover orchestral pieces and his modern use of the Danish "Vise" form.  His ensembles include the Kasper Bai Orchestet, the Kasper Bai Kvartet and Cordelia.

References
Website of Kasper Bai
Cordelia homepage
Myspace page for Kasper Bai

Danish guitarists
1974 births
Living people
Royal Danish Academy of Music alumni
People from Hjørring
21st-century guitarists